Marika Hara (born 2 September 1986) is a Finnish mountain bike orienteering competitor and world champion.

At the 2008 World MTB Orienteering Championships in Ostróda, she won a silver medal in the long distance, and a gold medal in the relay, together with Maija Lång and Ingrid Stengård. In Ben Shemen in 2009 she won a silver medal in the sprint, and a gold medal in the middle distance. At the 2010 World Championships she won two individual bronze medals and a silver medal in the relay.

References

Finnish orienteers
Female orienteers
Finnish female cyclists
Mountain bike orienteers
Living people
1986 births
Place of birth missing (living people)
Finnish mountain bikers